Robbi Lynn Ryan (born August 13, 1997) is an American professional basketball player. She played college basketball for the Arizona State Sun Devils before starting her professional career with Grindavík in the Icelandic Úrvalsdeild kvenna.

High school career
Ryan played basketball at Sheridan High School in Sheridan, Wyoming, where she was a four-time First Team All-State selection and two-time Gatorade Player of the Year for the State of Wyoming, and Ms. Wyoming Basketball in 2016.

College career
Ryan played four years of college basketball for the Arizona State Sun Devils. She started 103 of 131 career games and finished her career with 1,127 points. In her senior season, she was named to the First-team Pac-12 Conference.

Professional career
In August 2021, Ryan signed with Grindavík in the Icelandic Úrvalsdeild kvenna. On November 24, she scored a season-high 38 points in a victory against Breiðablik.

In March 2022, Ryan signed with the Joondalup Wolves in Australia for the 2022 NBL1 West season.

On August 4, 2022, Ryan signed with the Perth Lynx in Australia for the 2022–23 WNBL season. She is set to return to the Wolves for the 2023 NBL1 West season.

References

External links
Icelandic statistics at Icelandic Basketball Association
The Sun Devils Bio
Profile at Eurobasket.com

1997 births
Living people
American expatriate basketball people in Australia
American expatriate basketball people in Iceland
Arizona State Sun Devils women's basketball players
Robbi Ryan
Guards (basketball)
Robbi Ryan